Alberto Juzdado López (born 20 August 1966) is a Spanish long-distance runner. He specialized in the marathon race.

Juzdado won the Tokyo International Marathon race in 1998.

Achievements

Personal bests
3000 metres – 8:08.87 min (1998)
5000 metres – 13:33.87 min (1993)
10,000 metres – 27:57.85 min (1998)
Half marathon – 1:01:10 hrs (2000)
Marathon – 2:08:01 hrs (1998)

References

RFEA

External links
 
 
 

1966 births
Living people
Spanish male marathon runners
Athletes (track and field) at the 1996 Summer Olympics
Athletes (track and field) at the 2000 Summer Olympics
Olympic athletes of Spain
Athletes from Madrid
European Athletics Championships medalists
Spanish male long-distance runners
20th-century Spanish people